List of historic aircraft of the People's Liberation Army Air Force is a list of aircraft no-longer in service with the People's Liberation Army Air Force (PLAAF).

Domestic built aircraft

Foreign origin aircraft

See also
 People's Liberation Army

References

China's People's Liberation Army Air Force historic aircraft
People's Liberation Army Air Force
China's People's Liberation Army Air Force historic aircraft
Aircraft